is a Japanese voice actor and singer affiliated with the voice talent agency Aoni Production. His first major role in voice-over was Spark in the Record of Lodoss War: Chronicles of the Heroic Knight series. He voiced Hikaru Ichijyo in a number of Macross-related video games in the 2000s. Other major roles include Yuto Kiba in High School DxD, Jade in Ultimate Muscle, Nobuchika Ginoza in Psycho-Pass, Keisaku Sato in Shakugan no Shana, Taihei Doma in Himouto! Umaru-chan, and Tuxedo Mask in Sailor Moon Crystal.  In anime films, he voices Fumito Nanahara in Blood-C, Masaki in Time of Eve. He is the son of Akio Nojima and is the younger brother of Hirofumi Nojima. He married Chie Sawaguchi in 2004 and has two children.

Filmography

Anime

Films

Video games

Dubbing roles

Audio drama

References

External links
  
 Official agency profile 
 
 

1976 births
Living people
Japanese male voice actors
Japanese male video game actors
Japanese male pop singers
Male voice actors from Tokyo
Singers from Tokyo
20th-century Japanese male actors
21st-century Japanese male actors
21st-century Japanese singers
21st-century Japanese male singers
Aoni Production voice actors